The knockout stage of the 2019 FIFA Women's World Cup was the second and final stage of the competition, following the group stage. It began on 22 June with the round of 16 and ended on 7 July with the final match, held at the Parc Olympique Lyonnais in Décines-Charpieu. A total of 16 teams (the top two teams from each group, along with the four best third-placed teams) advanced to the knockout stage to compete in a single-elimination style tournament.

All times listed are local, CEST (UTC+2).

Format
In the knockout stage, if a match was level at the end of 90 minutes of normal playing time, extra time was played (two periods of 15 minutes each), where each team was allowed to make a fourth substitution. If still tied after extra time, the match was decided by a penalty shoot-out to determine the winner.

FIFA set out the following schedule for the round of 16:
 Match 37: Runners-up Group A v Runners-up Group C
 Match 38: Winners Group B v 3rd Group A / C / D
 Match 39: Winners Group D v 3rd Group B / E / F
 Match 40: Winners Group A v 3rd Group C / D / E
 Match 41: Runners-up Group B v Winners Group F
 Match 42: Runners-up Group F v Runners-up Group E
 Match 43: Winners Group C v 3rd Group A / B / F
 Match 44: Winners Group E v Runners-up Group D

Combinations of matches in the round of 16
In the round of 16, the four third-placed teams were matched with the winners of groups A, B, C, and D. The specific match-ups involving the third-placed teams depend on which four third-placed teams qualified for the round of 16:

Qualified teams
The top two placed teams from each of the six groups, plus the four best-placed third teams, qualified for the knockout stage.

Bracket

Round of 16

Germany vs Nigeria
German captain Alexandra Popp opened the scoring for her side in the 20th minute after heading in Lina Magull's corner from close range. In the 26th minute, Germany were awarded a penalty after Evelyn Nwabuoku was judged to have fouled Magull in the box after missing a clearance. Sara Däbritz converted the resulting penalty by scoring low to Chiamaka Nnadozie's left. Nigeria missed a great scoring chance early in the second half, when substitute Rasheedat Ajibade's low cross was missed by Nigerian captain Desire Oparanozie. In the 82nd minute, Germany scored their third goal when Halimatu Ayinde's misjudged back pass played in Lea Schüller, who shot low to the far post to seal the game for Germany.

Norway vs Australia
Australia started the match quickly: Caitlin Foord's through ball found Sam Kerr at the edge of the penalty area within 30 seconds. Kerr dribbled past Maren Mjelde, but shot just wide of Ingrid Hjelmseth's goal. At the half-hour mark, Karina Sævik's curling pass played in Isabell Herlovsen, who shot past Lydia Williams to give Norway the lead. Minutes before half-time, Australia were awarded a penalty after Maria Thorisdottir was judged to have handled Kerr's cross from the right. A subsequent VAR check revealed that Thorisdottir touched the ball with her shoulder and the penalty call was reversed. Kerr would have a goal ruled out in the 60th minute after she was judged to be offside. Elise Kellond-Knight equalised for Australia in the 83rd minute after her corner kick evaded all contact and bounced into the net at the far post. Caroline Graham Hansen almost won Norway the match in stoppage time when her curling strike from the edge of the penalty area struck the inside of the post and rolled along the goal line. The first period of extra time saw Williams make two strong saves to deny Norway, as well as Alanna Kennedy receive a red card after fouling Lisa-Marie Utland.

After a relatively tame second period of extra time, the match went to a penalty shoot-out. Graham Hansen scored the first penalty for Norway, shooting low to Williams left after she dove the wrong way. Kerr went first for Australia but sent her shot high and wide of the goal. After Guro Reiten copied her method, Emily Gielnik saw her low effort saved by Hjelmseth, who dove to her right to make the stop. After both Maren Mjelde and Steph Catley scored their penalties, Ingrid Syrstad Engen slotted into the bottom right corner to send Norway into the quarter-finals.

England vs Cameroon

In the 12th minute, England were awarded an indirect free kick in Cameroon's penalty area after goalkeeper Annette Ngo Ndom was judged to have picked up a back-pass from Augustine Ejangue. England captain Steph Houghton scored the free kick by shooting low into the bottom right corner. England doubled their lead in first half stoppage time when Ellen White received a pass from Lucy Bronze just inside the penalty area and sent a low left-footed shot past Ndom. Early in the second half, Ajara Nchout appeared to get a goal back for Cameroon after firing a Gabrielle Onguéné cutback into the top corner, but the goal was disallowed when a VAR check showed that Onguéné was offside in the build-up to the goal. Alexandra Takounda missed a great chance just after being brought in when she collected Alex Greenwood's weak back pass in front of goal. However, her effort was saved by Karen Bardsley. England added another goal in the 58th minute when Greenwood hit Toni Duggan's low driven corner into the net at the far post.

The fixture attracted considerable controversy. The actions of the Cameroonian players, including delaying the restart after England's second and third goals, as well as what was perceived to be deliberately rough play, prompted a FIFA investigation into their actions. Match referee Qin Liang also received significant criticism for failing to punish several Cameroonian infractions, and was seen to have lost control of the game.

France vs Brazil

Spain vs United States

Sweden vs Canada

Italy vs China PR

Netherlands vs Japan

Quarter-finals

Norway vs England

France vs United States

Italy vs Netherlands

Germany vs Sweden

Semi-finals

England vs United States

With the win, the United States extended their winning streak at the Women's World Cup to eleven matches, breaking the ten-match record of Norway set between 1995 and 1999, having last drawn against Sweden in the 2015 group stage. The U.S. also extended their undefeated streak to sixteen World Cup matches, breaking the record of fifteen set by Germany between 2003 and 2011, last losing against Sweden in the 2011 group stage (matches decided by penalty shoot-outs are counted as draws).

Netherlands vs Sweden

Third place play-off

Final

References

External links
 

2019 FIFA Women's World Cup
2019
Australia at the 2019 FIFA Women's World Cup
Brazil at the 2019 FIFA Women's World Cup
Cameroon at the 2019 FIFA Women's World Cup
Canada at the 2019 FIFA Women's World Cup
China at the 2019 FIFA Women's World Cup
England at the 2019 FIFA Women's World Cup
France at the 2019 FIFA Women's World Cup
Germany at the 2019 FIFA Women's World Cup
Italy at the 2019 FIFA Women's World Cup
Japan at the 2019 FIFA Women's World Cup
Netherlands at the 2019 FIFA Women's World Cup
Nigeria at the 2019 FIFA Women's World Cup
Norway at the 2019 FIFA Women's World Cup
Spain at the 2019 FIFA Women's World Cup
Sweden at the 2019 FIFA Women's World Cup
United States at the 2019 FIFA Women's World Cup